Karl Voll (18 July 1867 in Würzburg - December 25, 1917 in Munich) was  German art historian specialising in Dutch renaissance and baroque art.

Career
Voll studied Romance languages and English at the University of Munich, and from 1889 tough at a private school in Weyarn, from 1892-96 in Freising. He later studied art history and from 1986 became a full time art critic for the Allgemeine Zeitung. In 1896 he received his doctorate in Romance Studies in Munich, and in 1900 he graduated in Art History at the University of Munich.

Later, both Wilhelm Hausenstein and Julius Baum studied under him.

Selected works
 "The Painting Collection of Baron Albert Oppenheim, Cologne", 1917
 "The reorganization of the Alte Pinakothek", 1910
 "Die Werke des Jan van Eyck".
 "Memling: des Meisters Gemälde in 197 Abbildungen". Stuttgart und Leipzig : Deutsche verlagsanstalt, 1909
 "Die Weltreligionen in ihrem geschichtlichen Zusammenhänge". E. Diederichs, 1907
 "Die Altniederlandische Malerei Von Jan Van Eyck Bis Memling", 1906

References

External links
Bibliography, Deutsche Digitale Bibliothek

1867 births
1917 deaths
German art historians
Scholars of Netherlandish art